Mehmetçik Monument (Kartaltepe Mehmetçik Monument) is a monumental sculpture featuring a Turkish soldier on Kartaltepe of Polatlı, a rural area of Ankara Province, Turkey. The name of the monument Mehmetçik is the diminutive form of the common name Mehmet, which is used to nickname Turkish soldiers.

Location
It is to the south of the Turkish state highway , which connects west Anatolia to Ankara. Turkish high speed train railway route passes through a  tunnel under Kartaltepe.

History
The monument was sponsored by the Koç Holding and Tüpraş company. Binali Yıldırım, the Minister of Transport, Maritime and Communication, Yaşar Büyükanıt, the Chief of the Turkish General Staff, the sponsor Mustafa Koç as well as a group of MPs and the mayor of Polatlı were present in the opening ceremony on 6 August 2008. It is further planned to establish a museum about the Battle of Sakarya next to the monument.

Monument

The Battle of Sakarya was one of the most important milestones in the Greco-Turkish War (1919-1922). During the 22–day battle, the Greek army advanced as far as Kartaltepe hill. But during the counterattack of the Turkish forces, the Greek offence was checked. This was a critical turning point. One year later, the Greek army fell back and last of the Greek forces withdrew from Anatolia. The monument was erected to commemorate the turning point of the Turkish War of Independence at this site.

It is placed on a -high base. It is created by  Prof. Sait Rüstem and made of copper-coated concrete. It was constructed by TEKTA Eng. Consulting Cons. & Trade Ltd. Co.

References

2008 establishments in Turkey
Cultural infrastructure completed in 2008
Turkish War of Independence
Buildings and structures in Ankara Province
Monuments and memorials in Turkey
Copper sculptures in Turkey
Polatlı
Concrete sculptures in Turkey
Sculptures of men in Turkey